The 6th Congress of the Philippines (Filipino: Ikaanim na Kongreso ng Pilipinas), composed of the Philippine Senate and House of Representatives, met from January 17, 1966, until June 17, 1969, during the first three-and-a-half years of Ferdinand Marcos's presidency.

Sessions
First Special Session: January 17–22, 1966
First Regular Session: January 24 – May 19, 1966
Second Special Session: May 20 – June 18, 1966
Third Special Session: August 15–27, 1966
First Joint Session: April 25, April 25, June 1, 1966
Second Regular Session: January 23 – May 18, 1967
Fourth Special Session: June 1 – July 5, 1967
Fifth Special Session: July 17 – August 18, 1967
Second Joint Session: January 30, February 13, February 27, March 8, March 14–16, 1967
Third Regular Session: January 22 – May 16, 1968
Third Joint Session: February 20 – March 1, 1968
Sixth Special Session: May 17–28, 1968
Seventh Special Session: July 8 – August 10, 1968
Eighth Special Session: August 12–31, 1968
Fourth Regular Session: January 27 – May 22, 1969
Ninth Special Session: June 2 – July 5, 1969
Fourth Joint Session: June 11–17, 1969

Legislation
The Sixth Congress passed a total of 1,481 laws. (Republic Act Nos. 4643 – 6123)

Leadership

Senate
President of the Senate:
Arturo M. Tolentino (NP)
Gil J. Puyat (NP), elected January 26, 1967
Senate President Pro-Tempore:
Lorenzo M. Sumulong  (NP)
 Jose J. Roy  (NP), elected January 26, 1967
Majority Floor Leader:
 Jose J. Roy  (NP)
Rodolfo T. Ganzon  (NP)
Arturo M. Tolentino (NP)
Minority Floor Leader:
Ambrosio Padilla (LP)

House of Representatives
Speaker:
Cornelio T. Villareal (LP, 2nd District Capiz)
José B. Laurel, Jr. (NP, 3rd District Batangas), elected February 2, 1967
Speaker Pro-Tempore:
Salipada K. Pendatun (LP, Lone District Cotabato)
Jose M. Aldeguer (NP, 5th District Iloilo)
Majority Floor Leader:
Justiniano S. Montano (NP, Lone District Cavite)
Marcelino R. Veloso (NP, 3rd District Leyte)
Minority Floor Leader:
José B. Laurel, Jr. (NP, 3rd District Batangas)

Members

Senate

Notes

House of Representatives

Further reading
Philippine House of Representatives Congressional Library

See also
Congress of the Philippines
Senate of the Philippines
House of Representatives of the Philippines
1965 Philippine general election
1967 Philippine general election

External links

06
Third Philippine Republic